Peter Keleghan (born September 16, 1959) is a Canadian actor and writer, perhaps best known for portraying Ben Bellow in the comedy series 18 to Life, Clark Claxton Sr. in the comedy series Billable Hours and Ranger Gord in The Red Green Show.  Currently has a recurring role on Murdoch Mysteries as government agent/spy, Terrence Meyers.

Early life
Keleghan was born in Montreal, Quebec. He earned his BA in English Drama from York University in Toronto, Ontario.

Career
Keleghan has had a long career in film and television, mostly in comedic roles starting in the Smith & Smith spin off comedy sketch show, Comedy Mill. His best-known roles have been film industry CEO Alan Roy on Made in Canada, news anchor Jim Walcott on The Newsroom, Ranger Gord on The Red Green Show, Ben Bellow on 18 to Life and special agent Terrence Myers on Murdoch Mysteries. His other television performances include  Seinfeld, and Queer as Folk.

Some of his film work includes Picture Perfect, Ginger Snaps, Eating Buccaneers and GravyTrain. Kelghan has also provided the voice of Scaredy Bat, a character in the animated series Ruby Gloom.

In 2009 Keleghan was awarded the ACTRA Award of Excellence in recognition of his body of work.

Personal life
Keleghan is married to actress Leah Pinsent. She appeared in an episode of season fifteen of Murdoch Mysteries, playing his TV wife.

Filmography

References

External links
Peter Keleghan on The Canadian Encyclopedia

Living people
Canadian male television actors
Canadian male voice actors
Canadian male film actors
Anglophone Quebec people
Best Actor in a Comedy Series Canadian Screen Award winners
Male actors from Montreal
York University alumni
Year of birth missing (living people)